J.P.L. Francis was an Indian politician from the state of the Madhya Pradesh.
He represented Rajnandgaon constituency of the undivided Madhya Pradesh Legislative Assembly, by winning the 1957 Madhya Pradesh Legislative Assembly election.

References 

Year of birth missing
Possibly living people
Madhya Pradesh MLAs 1957–1962
People from Rajnandgaon
Praja Socialist Party politicians